On Board of the Kangaroo also known as On Board the Kangaroo, Aboard the Kangaroo, Good Ship Kangaroo and Bristol Sea Shanty is generally regarded as an English shanty.  It's said to have been composed by Harry Clifton and had been published in 1856. The song is sung from the perspective of a mariner who worked on a ship called the Kangaroo which was probably the SS Kangaroo; a British Passenger and mercantile ship. It has a Roud Folk Song Index number of 925.

Notable Recordings 

 Burl Ives - Songs of Ireland (1958)
 Planxty - After the Break (1979)
 Nic Jones - In Search of Nic Jones (1998)
 Tony Rose - Bare Bones (1999)
 Waldorf String Band - Celtic Celebration (2014)

References 

Sea shanties
British folk songs